This is a list of Culver City municipal parks. Culver City is an incorporated city in western Los Angeles County, California. The city operates 14 parks within city limits. 

 Blair Hills Park
 Carlson Park - originally Victory Park, renamed in honor of Dr. Paul Carlson
 Culver City Park - connection from Ballona Creek to Park to Playa Trail, Little League fields, dog park, skate park
 Culver West Alexander Park - footpath access to Del Rey neighborhood  
 El Marino Park, Sunkist Park neighborhood - ceramics studio with kiln
 Fox Hills Park, Fox Hills neighborhood 
 Lindberg Park - “Stone House” community events and cooperative preschool
 Syd Kronenthal Park - formerly called McManus Park, starting point of Ballona Creek Bike Path
 Tellefson Park
 Veterans Memorial Park - auditorium and meeting spaces, municipal pool; adjacent to senior center, teen center and Wende Museum

Pocket parks:
 Coombs Parkette
 Fox Hills Parkette

Parks operated as shared space with CCUSD elementary schools, and thus with restricted access hours for the public: 
 Outdoor Play Area at Linwood Howe Elementary 
 Blanco Park at El Rincon Elementary

See also
List of parks in Los Angeles County, California
 Culver Boulevard Median Bike Path
 Stoneview Nature Center

References 

Culver City, California

Culver City, California